Two ships of the Royal Navy have been named HMS Wear:

  was a  launched in 1905 and sold for scrap in 1919
  was a  launched in 1942 and scrapped in 1957

Royal Navy ship names